“Second Avenue” is a song written by American singer-songwriter Tim Moore. The song was released in 1974 as Moore's second single from his debut LP, concurrently with a version by Art Garfunkel (billed as simply Garfunkel), which received greater notice. 

The Garfunkel recording was a non-album single.  It peaked at No. 6 on the US Billboard Adult Contemporary chart, No. 34 on the Billboard Hot 100, and also charted in Canada and Australia.

Chart performance
Tim Moore

Garfunkel cover

Covers
Others who have recorded cover versions of the song include Colin Blunstone (on his 2009 album The Ghost of You and Me).

References

External links
 Lyrics of this song
 
 

1974 songs
1974 singles
Asylum Records singles
Columbia Records singles
Art Garfunkel songs
Tim Moore (singer-songwriter) songs